The Assiniboine are a Native American/First Nations people. Assiniboine may also refer to:

Assiniboine language, one of the Siouan languages

Places
 Assiniboine River, a river that runs through the prairies of Western Canada in Saskatchewan and Manitoba
 Mount Assiniboine in eastern British Columbia, Canada
 Fort Assiniboine, Alberta, Canada
 Fort Assinniboine, Montana, U.S.
 Winnipeg—Assiniboine, a former Canadian federal electoral district
 Mount Assiniboine Provincial Park, a provincial park in British Columbia, Canada, located around Mount Assiniboine.

Ships
 , River-class destroyer, served 1939-1945
 , St. Laurent-class destroyer, served 1956-1988
Schools
 Assiniboine Community College, community college in Manitoba, Canada

Other
 Assiniboine Herald, one of the heralds at the Canadian Heraldic Authority